There have been at least three competitions in Scotland known as the Central Football League

The first was originally formed in 1896 by five clubs - Cowdenbeath, Dunfermline Athletic, Fair City Athletic, Kirkcaldy and St Johnstone. In 1897 this version was superseded by the Central Football Combination.

Champions
1896–97 Cowdenbeath
1897–98 not completed

Membership

Alloa Athletic 1897–1898
Cowdenbeath 1896–1898
Dundee 'A' 1897–98
Dunfermline Athletic 1896–1898
Fair City Athletic 1896–1897
Hearts of Beith 1897–1898
Kircaldy 1896–1898
Lochgelly United 1896–1898
St Johnstone 1896–97

The Central League was reformed in 1909 with twelve members - Alloa Athletic, Arbroath, Bathgate, Bo'ness, Broxburn Athletic, Dunfermline Athletic, East Fife, King's Park, Kirkcaldy United, Lochgelly United and St Johnstone. The League closed down after 1915 because of World War I and a number of clubs transferred to the new Eastern Football League.

Champions

1909–10 Bo'ness
1910–11 Dunfermline Athletic
1911–12 Dunfermline Athletic
1912–13 Alloa Athletic
1913–14 Armadale
1914–15 Armadale
 
Membership

Alloa Athletic 1909–1915
Arbroath 1909–1915
Armadale 1911–1915
Bathgate 1909–1914
Bo'ness 1909–1915
Broxburn 1911–1912
Broxburn Athletic 1909–1910
Broxburn United 1912–1915
Clackmannan 1914–1915
Dundee 'A' 1912–1915
Dunfermline Athletic 1909–1912
East Fife 1909–1915
Falkirk 'A' 1912–1912
Forfar Athletic 1913–1915
Heart of Midlothian 'A' 1910–1911
King's Park 1909–1915
Kirkcaldy United 1909–1915
Lochgelly United 1909–1912, 1913–1914
Montrose 1914–1915
St Johnstone F.C. 1909–1911
Stenhousemuir 1909–1915

The league closed down in 1915 because of the War but when the Scottish Football League refused to re-institute the Second Division in 1919, the Central Football League was re-formed. Since this competition was independent, member clubs could attract players by paying higher wages than those allowed under the maximum wage rules that applied to Scottish League clubs.

Champions

1919–20 Bo'ness
1920–21 Bo'ness

Membership

Alloa Athletic 1919–1921
Armadale 1919–1921
Bathgate 1919–1921
Bo'ness 1919–1921
Broxburn United 1919–1921
Clackmannan 1920–1921
Cowdenbeath 1920–1921
Dundee Hibernian 1920–1921
Dunfermline Athletic 1919–1921
East Fife 1919–1921
East Stirlingshire 1919–1921
Falkirk 'A' 1919–1921
Heart of Midlothian 'A' 1919–1921
King's Park 1919–1921
Lochgelly United 1920–1921
St Bernard's 1919–1921
St Johnstone 1920–1921
Stenhousemuir 1919–1921

In 1921, the Central League was absorbed by the Scottish League as the Second Division.

References

Defunct football leagues in Scotland